Strange Adults is a Soviet lyrical television film of 1974, which tells of the complexity of the relationship between adults and children. The plot is based on the same story by Arkady Minchkovsky.

Plot
The elderly childless spouses adopt the orphanage girl Tonya. Tidy's childish frankness, a lack of understanding that things may not be common, but someone's, her trustful contact and excessive independence prevent her from finding a rapport with her new-found parents.

Cast
  as Tonya
 Lev Durov as Pyotr Vasilievich Ryabikov
  Irina Kirichenko  as Anna Ryabikova, Pyotr Vasilievich's wife
  Yevgeniya Khanayeva as Augusta Yakovlevna
Zinovy Gerdt as Oleg    Kuks
 Alexander Demyanenko as Yevgeny  Nalivaiko
 Antonina Shuranova as Nina Ivanovna
 Yuri Kamorny as Yura

Shooting Group 
Director: Ayan Shahmaliyeva
Writers: Maria Zvereva, Arkady Minchkovsky
Cinematographer: Yuri Veksler
Composer: Veniamin Basner
Artists: Marksen Gaukhman-Sverdlov, Rimma Narinyan

Awards
   Prize  (1975)
   Grand Prix  (1975)

Criticism
Rita Sergeyecheva and  talented tragic actor Lev Durov are so human, courageous and at the same time so defenseless that you watch the film - and all the while trampling in the nose treacherously. Particularly light final scene.

The film is not afraid of reproaches in sentimentality, moreover, it has its direct aim to provoke in us, the spectators, the simplest and warmest emotions and frank desire that everything ends wellю  Rita Sergeycheva played Tonya. She played her harsh and childish straightforwardness and organic categorical, collectivism, her absolute misunderstanding that things may not be common, but someone's, her trustful contact and some kind of bitterly bitter independence of the child. In general, this film is overly talked, and its plot   for the television is too tightly knit. There would be more pauses, accidents that do not serve this very plot, more than that artistically necessary non-essentiality in the frame to which the best works of the television movie.

References

External links
 

1974 films
Lenfilm films
Soviet television films
Russian children's drama films
Soviet drama films
1970s Russian-language films
1974 television films
1970s children's drama films
1974 drama films
Russian television films
Soviet children's films